Gloria Pizzichini was the defending champion but lost in the second round to Sarah Pitkowski.

15-year-old Mirjana Lučić won in the final 7–5, 6–7, 7–6 against Corina Morariu. The tournament was Lučić's professional debut on the WTA Tour.

Seeds
A champion seed is indicated in bold text while text in italics indicates the round in which that seed was eliminated.

  Amanda Coetzer (semifinals)
  Dominique Van Roost (first round)
  Henrieta Nagyová (first round)
  Katarína Studeníková (quarterfinals)
  Alexandra Fusai (second round)
  Miriam Oremans (first round)
  Gloria Pizzichini (second round)
  Annabel Ellwood (first round)

Draw

External links
 1997 Croatian Bol Ladies Open Draw

Croatian Bol Ladies Open
1997 WTA Tour